Skillen is a surname. Notable people with the surname include:

 James Skillen, American Christian philosopher and author
 Keith Skillen (1948–2013), English footballer